The following lists events that happened during 1847 in Australia.

Incumbents

Governors
Governors of the Australian colonies:
Governor of South Australia - Lieutenant Colonel Frederick Holt Robe
Governor of Tasmania - Sir William Denison
Governor of Western Australia as a Crown Colony - Lieutenant-Colonel Andrew Clarke, then Lieutenant-Colonel Frederick Irwin (acting).

Events
 15 July - St Peter's College, Adelaide is founded by members of the Anglican Church of Australia.
 28 December - Augustus Short, the first Anglican bishop of Adelaide, South Australia arrives from England.

Births

 12 February – Sir Albert Gould, New South Wales politician (d. 1936)
 19 February – Josiah Howell Bagster, South Australian politician and land agent (d. 1893)
 22 February – James Huddart, shipowner and businessman (d. 1901)
 6 March – Edward Petherick, book collector and archivist (d. 1917)
 13 March – Samuel Cooke, Victorian politician (d. 1929)
 5 April – Frederick William Ward, journalist and newspaper editor (d. 1934)
 7 April – John Arthur, Tasmanian cricketer (d. 1877)
 23 May – Robert Etheridge Jr., paleontologist (born in the United Kingdom) (d. 1920)
 23 July – George Sydney Aldridge, businessman (born in the United Kingdom) (d. 1911)
 22 August – Sir John Forrest, 1st Premier of Western Australia and explorer (d. 1918)
 3 October – Henry Montgomery, Anglican bishop (d. 1932)
 8 October – Rose Scott, suffragette (d. 1925)
 29 October – George Collingridge, writer and illustrator (d. 1931)
 11 October – Alexander Bolton, New South Wales politician (d. 1918)
 17 November – Archibald Liversidge, chemist (d. 1927)
 10 December – Harry Boyle, Test cricketer (d. 1907)

Deaths

 3 February – Sir John Eardley-Wilmot, 6th Lieutenant-Governor of Van Diemen's Land (born in the United Kingdom) (b. 1783)
 11 February – Sir Andrew Clarke, 4th Governor of Western Australia (born in Ireland) (b. 1793)
 25 May – Joseph Wild, explorer (born in the United Kingdom) (b. 1773)
 11 June – Sir John Franklin, 4th Lieutenant-Governor of Van Diemen's Land (born in the United Kingdom and died in Canada) (b. 1786)

References

 
Australia
Years of the 19th century in Australia